UAP Old Mutual Tower is a 33-storey office complex in the Upper Hill neighborhood of Nairobi, the capital and largest city in Kenya. It became the tallest structure in Kenya upon its completion in 2015, surpassing Times Tower which had held that record for 15 years.

Location

Overview
UAP Tower is owned by UAP Old Mutual Group, a financial services conglomerate headquartered in Kenya, with subsidiaries in six African countries. It has rentable space that measures , and will also house the UAP Old Mutual Group headquarters once it is completely finished. The tower was financed through private equity at a total of KSh 4 billion (approximately US$40,000,000 as of 2015). The building opened for business on 5 July 2016 and was 50 percent filled on opening day.

Gallery

See also
List of tallest buildings in Kenya
List of tallest buildings in Africa

References

External links
 
 

Buildings and structures in Nairobi
Office buildings completed in 2015
2015 establishments in Kenya
Skyscraper office buildings in Kenya